Rapperswil-Jona–Technikum is one of the 111 serial sites of the UNESCO World Heritage Site Prehistoric pile dwellings around the Alps, of which are 56 located in Switzerland. Located on a small former island on upper Lake Zürich in Rapperswil, a locality of the municipality of Rapperswil-Jona in the Canton of St. Gallen. Due to its location on a former island at the medieval Heilig Hüsli bridge chapel, the site sometimes is also referred to Rapperswil Heilighüsli or Inseldorf, meaning island village.

Geography 
The site is located on a former island on upper Lake Zürich between the former Technicum university and the so-called Heilig Hüsli bridge chapel in Rapperswil. Situated at the Seedamm, an isthmus between the Zürichsee and the Obersee lake area, the former island settlement was in close vicinity to the prehistoric lake crossings, and neighboured by three other Prehistoric pile dwelling settlements: Freienbach–Hurden Rosshorn, Freienbach–Hurden Seefeld and Rapperswil-Jona/Hombrechtikon–Feldbach. The settlement comprises , and the buffer zone including the lake area comprises  in all.

Description 
Multiple palisades and a clear visible settlement structure, located on a former island in the Obersee, characterise the Early Bronze Age site dated in the 17th century BC. It points to the same period as the early footbridges across the Seedamm between Rapperswil and Hurden-Rosshorn. The settlement was certainly of great importance as the centre of the region, and it may even have played a role in controlling this important transport route.

Finds 
The finds include ceramic and dress pins, daggers, arrowheads, and fish hooks made of bronze, which were probably thrown as offerings into the lake. The individual finds are varied, including pottery shards, an almost completely preserved decorated ceramic vessel, a stone and a bronze ax and a piece of a gold wire; a rare golden object yet discovered from the Bronze Age in Switzerland. As remarkable is a mold made of soapstone for razor of the so-called alpine type. Such blades have been found in the Alpine region, where the soapstone comes from, so the settlement probably served as a hub for the trade with the Alpine passes.

Protection 
As well as being part of the 56 Swiss sites of the UNESCO World Heritage Site Prehistoric pile dwellings around the Alps, the settlement is also listed in the Swiss inventory of cultural property of national and regional significance as a Class A object of national importance. Hence, the area of each settlement is provided as a historical site under federal protection, within the meaning of the Swiss Federal Act on the nature and cultural heritage (German: Bundesgesetz über den Natur- und Heimatschutz NHG) of 1 July 1966. Unauthorised researching and purposeful gathering of findings represent a criminal offense according to Art. 24.

See also 
 Prehistoric pile dwellings around Zürichsee

Literature 
 Peter J. Suter, Helmut Schlichtherle et al.: Pfahlbauten – Palafittes – Palafitte. Palafittes, Biel 2009. .
 Beat Eberschweiler: Ur- und frühgeschichtliche Verkehrswege über den Zürichsee: Erste Ergebnisse aus den Taucharchäologischen Untersuchungen beim Seedamm. In: Mitteilungen des Historischen Vereins des Kantons Schwyz, Volume 96, Schwyz 2004.

References

External links 

 

Prehistoric pile dwellings in Switzerland
Rapperswil-Jona
Lake Zurich
Cultural property of national significance in the canton of St. Gallen
Archaeological sites in Switzerland